Alison Jackson (born May 15, 1960) is an English artist, photographer, and filmmaker whose work explores the theme of celebrity culture. Jackson makes realistic work of celebrities doing things in private using cleverly styled lookalikes.

Education
Jackson attended the Chelsea College of Art and Design in London between 1993 and 1997, and graduated with a BA (Hons) in Fine Art (Sculpture). From 1997 to 1999, Jackson studied for a MA in Fine-art photography at the Royal College of Art (RCA) in London.

Career

In 1999, Jackson created black-and-white photographs that appeared to show Princess Diana and Dodi Al-Fayed with a mixed-race love child. The photographs, titled Mental Images, were part of her graduation show at the RCA. She has used lookalikes to create photographs and films of celebrities in private situations. At the RCA, Jackson won a number of awards including The Photographers' Gallery Award and in 2002, her advertising campaign for Schweppes drinks won gold and silver awards from Campaign magazine.

Jackson wrote, directed, and co-produced BBC Two's 2003 series Doubletake with Tiger Aspect. The show won an award at the 2002 BAFTAs. She made a series of mockumentaries and fake biopics for Channel 4 about public figures, using George W Bush and Tony Blair lookalikes in a series of staged scenes of their public lives. Blaired Vision, broadcast on 26 June 2007, coincided with Blair's exit from office.

Jackson performed a one-woman show, Shot to Fame, in 2018 at Soho Theatre, and Double Fake Show in 2019 at Leicester Square Theater.

Since 2018, she has served as a Conservative Party (UK) councillor for the Chelsea Riverside ward on Royal Borough of Kensington and Chelsea.

Art Exhibitions

 1997 Attix Studio Gloucester Road, London, UK
 1999 The Blue Gallery; "Temple of Diana Show" curated by Neal Brown
 1999 The Royal Festival Hall, London; "Articultural Show"
 1999 The Richard Salmon Gallery, London, UK
 2000 Edinburgh Festival
 2000 Art 2000 London
 2000 The Richard Salmon Gallery, London, UK
 2001 Jerwood Space ; "Mental Images", London, UK
 2002 Paris Photo, Musée du Louvre, Paris, France 
 2002 The Musee de la Photographie a Charleroi, Brussels, Belgium
 2003 Female Turbulence; AEROPLASTICS Contemporary; Brussels, Belgium
 2003 ICP International Center of Photography, New York
 2003 Musée de l'Elysée, Lausanne.
 2003 'Mental Images on War’; The Richard Salmon Gallery, London, UK
 2003 Le Mois de la Photo, Montreal, Canada
 2004 About Face: Photography and the Death of the Portrait; Hayward Gallery; London, UK
 2004 Photo, London, UK
 2004 Election Year 2004; Julie Saul Gallery; New York, U.S.A.
 2005 Superstars; Kunsthalle Wien and BA-CA Kunstforum, Vienna, Austria
 2006 Mak Museum, Vienna, Austria
 2007 Paris Photo, Hamiltons Gallery, London, UK
 2007 Confidential; M+B Gallery; Los Angeles, U.S.A.
 2008 Starstruck: Contemporary Art and the Cult of Celebrity; The New Art Gallery; Walsall, UK
 2008 Bush with Rubik's Cube Intervention Sculpture; Tate Liverpool Biennial, Tate Liverpool, UK
 2008 Seeing is Deceiving; Hamiltons Gallery; London, UK
 2009 J. Sheekey, London, UK
 2010 Rude Britannia: British Comic Art; Tate Britain; London, UK
 2010 Exposed:Voyeurism, Surveillance and the Camera Since 1870; Tate Modern; London, U.K.
 2011 SF Moma, San Francisco, USA
 2011 The Royal Family; Hayward Gallery, Southbank Centre, London, UK
 2011 Peeping Tom, KunstHalle Amsterdam, Nederlands
 2011 Alison Jackson: Up the Aisle; Ben Brown Fine Arts, London, UK
 2011 Exposed: Voyeurism, Surveillance and the Camera Since 1870; Friedman Gallery, Walker Art Centre; U.S.A.
 2013 Anderson Pertwee and Gold, London, UK
 2013 Fondation D’Entreprise Frances, France
 2014 Centre Pompidou, Paparazzi, Paris, France
 2014 Schon Museum, Frankfurt, Germany
 2015 NRW/Forum, Düsseldorf, Germany
 2016 Museum Villa Rot, Burgrieden, Germany
 2016 HG Contemporary, New York, USA
 2016 Culture Station 284, Seoul, South Korea
 2017 London Art Fair, London, UK
 2017 Haifa Museum of Art, Haifa, Israel: "AnonymX: The End of the Privacy Era"
 2018, The Royal Academy of Art, 150th Summer Exhibition, London, UK
 2019, Fotografiska, Tallinn, Estonia
 2019 Truth is Dead Fotografiska, Stockholm, Sweden
 2019 Fake Truth; Westlicht Museum,  Vienna, Austria
 2020 Private; Camera Work, Berlin, Germany
 2021 Fake Truth; The Photogallery, Sweden
 2021 Double Take; Coe and Co, Nantucket, Palm Beach
 2021 Truth is Dead; Fotografiska, LA
 2021 True Fictions; Palazzo Magnani, Italy

Bibliography
 Private (2004, Penguin Books)
 Confidential: What you see in this book is not 'real' (2007, Taschen)
Up the Aisle, (2011, Quadrille publishing)
 Stern Fotographie 70 (2012, teNeues)
Private, (2016, published by Alison Jackson)

Television
Jackson has created many TV shows and was the artist and creator behind BBC Two 2003 series Doubletake, which she created, wrote, directed, and co-produced with Tiger Aspect, and for which she won and was nominated for BAFTAs.

 2001–2003 Schweppes UK: advertising campaign. Created concept, devised ideas and photographed
 2002 Doubletake. BBC2. Created, directed, wrote special. BAFTA
 2003 Doubletake. BBC2. Created, directed, wrote and produced 6 part series based on Mental Images
 2003 Doubletake Christmas special
 2004/5 Saturday Night Live, NBC
 2005 Channel 4: Not the Royal Wedding
 2005 Channel 4: The Secret Election
 2006 Channel 4: Tony Blair, Rock Star
 2006 Channel 4: Sven: The Cash, The Coach & his Lovers
 2007 Channel 4: Blaired Vision
 2008 BBC2: Through the Keyhole guest home owner first broadcast on 28 May
 2009 ITV1: The South Bank Show – 'Alison Jackson on Warhol
 2010: BBC Historical Series
 2011 & 2012 Sky: ‘The Alison Jackson Review’
 2012 BBC: Celebrity BitchSlap News
 2015 BBC: La Trashiata – Opera performed at the Edinburgh Arts Festival

Opera & theatre 
 2015 La Trashiata: Edinburgh Fringe Festival, BBC Online and Odeon Cinema
2015  Edinburgh Festival, La Trashiata Opera, a 'celebrity' performance opera for the Edinburgh Fringe Festival, with exclusive screenings on the BBC and Odeon cinemas.
2018-2019 Jackson performed in her own one woman theatre show Shot to Fame - at Soho Theatre and Leicester Square Theater with Double Take Show :  One minute Jackson talks anecdotes showing her films and photographs.  The next minute she takes people from the audience and transforms them on stage into a 'celebrity’ - Stars in your Eyes style - no talent needed! Ending in a Live Photo shoot and a ‘celebrity’ walk - about - are the fans disappointed or excited with their new ’Star’

References

External links

 
 
  "An unusual glimpse at celebrity" (TEDGlobal 2005)

1970 births
Living people
20th-century English women artists
21st-century English women artists
Alumni of the Royal College of Art
People from Southsea
Photographers from Hampshire
BAFTA winners (people)
Conservative Party (UK) councillors